Blowin' Away is an album by trumpeters Dizzy Reece and Ted Curson which was recorded in 1976 and first released on the Interplay label.

Reception

Allmusic awarded the album 4 stars with its review by Scott Yanow stating "It is a pity that Reece and Curson do not get to tangle on all of the numbers, but they do shoot off some fireworks (most notably on "Walkin'"); the playing by all of the veterans is up to par".

Track listing
 "Stella by Starlight" (Victor Young, Ned Washington) - 6:13  
 "All The Things You Are" (Jerome Kern, Oscar Hammerstein II) - 6:16  
 "Bass Conclave" (Dizzy Reece) - 6:24  
 "Moose the Mooche" (Charlie Parker) - 5:11  
 "Marjo" (Ted Curson) - 6:50  
 "Walkin'" (Richard Carpenter) - 8:48

Personnel
Dizzy Reece - trumpet (tracks 1, 3, 5 & 6)
Ted Curson - trumpet, flugelhorn (tracks 2, 3, 5 & 6) 
Claude Williamson - piano
Sam Jones - bass 
Roy Haynes - drums

References

1978 albums
Dizzy Reece albums
Ted Curson albums
Interplay Records albums